Thelesperma filifolium, commonly known as stiff greenthread, or plains greenthread, is a species of flowering plant in the aster family, Asteraceae. It is often found growing in shallow soils. It prefers disturbed sites in dry, sandy or gravelly soil with a neutral to basic pH. Stiff greenthread adapts to various soil conditions, including loam, clay, caliche, and roadsides. It blooms between March and June and often into the fall.

Distribution
In Texas, stiff greenthread can be found growing along roadsides and on dry hills in the South Plains and Edwards Plateau regions. The herb grows over much of the plains and mountain states, reaching up to Wyoming, Montana, Nebraska and South Dakota. It grows prolifically on the Navajo, Hopi, and Pueblo lands, as well as throughout much of New Mexico, Arizona and Colorado.

Description
Having a taproot, it is extremely resistant to drought, but thrives in rain. The designation greenthread is most appropriate, as it has thin, thread-like leaves. It can be single-stemmed or multi-stemmed, and reaches a height of 12 to 26 inches. The leaves are scattered along the whole stem. The daisy-like, 2 inch, eight-ray flowers are golden-yellow and the numerous disk flowers are reddish to dark brown. The urn-shaped bloom buds droop downward prior to opening. The inner whorl of phyllaries surrounding the lower portion of the bloom is translucent, which allows the colors of the developing flowers to be seen. When open, there are two types of phyllary at the base of the bloom: one is short and green, the other red and long.

Ecology
The ripened seeds are a food source for the multi-colored painted bunting. It does not appear to be ravaged by deer. It is also a good larval and nectar plant for butterflies and is a larval food for the sulphur butterfly.

Uses
The crushed leaves offer a pleasant aroma and can be made into tea, which is sometimes used medicinally by several Native American tribes. This is especially widespread among southwest tribes, where it is named Navajo tea, Hopi tea, or Indian tea.

References

External links

http://medplant.nmsu.edu/thelesperma.htm
Artisan Steve Heil grows his own greenthread crop in New Mexico.

Coreopsideae
Plants described in 1849
Plants used in traditional Native American medicine